Konstantin Borisovich Loktev (April 16, 1933 – November 4, 1996) was a Soviet ice hockey player who played in the Soviet Hockey League. He played for HC CSKA Moscow. He was inducted into the Russian and Soviet Hockey Hall of Fame in 1964. He was born and died in Moscow.

Career statistics

International

External links
 Joe Pelletier's GREATEST HOCKEY LEGENDS.COM
 THE SUMMIT in 1974
 TEAM CCCP Players Info
 
 Константин Борисович Локтев 

1933 births
1996 deaths
HC CSKA Moscow players
Ice hockey players at the 1960 Winter Olympics
Ice hockey players at the 1964 Winter Olympics
IIHF Hall of Fame inductees
Olympic medalists in ice hockey
Soviet ice hockey players
Ice hockey people from Moscow
Medalists at the 1960 Winter Olympics
Medalists at the 1964 Winter Olympics
Russian ice hockey players
Olympic gold medalists for the Soviet Union
Olympic bronze medalists for the Soviet Union